Lisa Marie Osofsky (born 18 September 1961) is an American-British lawyer who has served as Director of the UK's Serious Fraud Office (SFO) since 3 September 2018.

Early life
Osofsky has dual American and British nationality. She earned a bachelor's degree from Amherst College, and a juris doctor from Harvard Law School.

Career
Osofsky worked for the FBI as deputy general counsel. She was then managing director and European head of investigations at Exiger, whom she joined in 2003.

She began her career working as a US federal prosecutor, taking on white collar crime cases including defence contractor and bank frauds, money laundering and drug related conspiracies. She spent five years as Deputy General Counsel and Ethics Officer at the FBI and was seconded to the SFO whilst a Special Attorney in the US Department of Justice’s Fraud Division. She was also called to the Bar in England and Wales.

Osofsky has worked three years for Goldman Sachs International as their Money Laundering Reporting Officer and spent seven years in the Corporate Investigation Division of Control Risks, where she advised on compliance issues.

Prior to joining the SFO, Osofsky worked for Exiger, a global governance, risk and compliance advisory firm, where she served as Regional Leader and Head of Investigations for Europe, Middle East and Africa. In this capacity she was also in charge of monitoring a Deferred Prosecution Agreement (DPA) which the HSBC’s signed with the US Department of Justice.
 
In June 2018, it was announced that Osofsky would succeed the SFO's interim director Mark Thompson (who was standing in since David Green left) on 3 September.

During her term she had repeatedly faced severe criticism. In particular Osofsky’s handling of the so called “Unaoil” investigation was commented by lawmakers as marked by “serious and very, very basic errors”. This led to speculation over her future. especially when the then Attorney General, Suella Braverman QC MP, launched an independent review into the SFO, commissioning a “forensic and robust” probe of Osofsky’s agency. It  was conducted by a former director of public prosecutions and a retired High Court judge Sir David Calvert-Smith

Lisa Osofsky was finally judged to have made a “number of mistakes and misjudgments” in her handling of a prosecution which has ultimately resulted in the convictions of two businessmen being overturned. SFO head was criticized for failings that denied defendant fair trial. The report criticized and exposed “fundamental failures” at the UK’s anti-fraud agency, including Osofsky’s use of her personal mobile, lack of accountability, undocumented and unminuted meetings with a fixer. 
It also attested major errors as severe mishandlings of cases, disclosure failures, amplified by the impression that a U.S. fixer had the “seal of approval” from the director. and “toxic” relationship between staff and senior management. A “damaging culture of distrust between the case team and senior managers developed, the review said.

Personal life
Osofsky is married to fellow lawyer Marc Wassermann.

References

Living people
Members of the Middle Temple
Amherst College alumni
Harvard Law School alumni
21st-century British lawyers
21st-century American lawyers
Civil servants in the Serious Fraud Office (United Kingdom)
1961 births